Sikkim Congress (Revolutionary) was political party in the Indian state of Sikkim in 1979–1981. The president of the party was Ram Chandra Poudyal. In the state assembly elections of 1979, SCR(R) won eleven seats (of 32) and became the largest faction in the assembly. In total, the party received  votes (20.58% of the votes in the state). The strength of the party did however decline when several assembly members crossed over to Sikkim Prajatantra Congress.

In the Lok Sabha elections of 1980, the SC(R) candidate won  votes (22.59% of the votes in Sikkim).

Electoral records

Sikkim Legislative Assembly

Lok Sabha election, Sikkim

References

Defunct political parties in Sikkim
Political parties established in 1979
1979 establishments in Sikkim
Political parties disestablished in 1980
1980 disestablishments in India